Aplosonyx is a genus of beetle belonging to the family Chrysomelidae.

Selected species
 Aplosonyx albicornis (Wiedemann, 1821)
 Aplosonyx ancora Laboissiere, 1934
 Aplosonyx apicalis (Weise, 1922)
 Aplosonyx apicicornis (Jacoby, 1886)
 Aplosonyx banksi (Weise, 1913)
 Aplosonyx basalis (Jacoby, 1896)
 Aplosonyx batuensis (Jacoby, 1897)
 Aplosonyx chalybeus (Hope, 1831)
 Aplosonyx collaris (Duvivier, 1885)
 Aplosonyx duvivieri (Jacoby, 1900)
 Aplosonyx fraternus (Duvivier, 1891)
 Aplosonyx frenbi (Bowditch, 1925)
 Aplosonyx fulvicornis (Weise, 1913)
 Aplosonyx fulvoplagiatus (Jacoby, 1897)
 Aplosonyx humeralis (Bowditch, 1925)
 Aplosonyx indicus (Jacoby, 1896)
 Aplosonyx inornatus (Jacoby, 1892)
 Aplosonyx kinabaluensis Mohamedsaid, 1999
 Aplosonyx lituratus (Weise, 1922)
 Aplosonyx monticola (Bowditch, 1925)
 Aplosonyx mouhoti (Baly, 1879)
 Aplosonyx nigriceps Yang, 1995
 Aplosonyx nigricollis (Duvivier, 1885)
 Aplosonyx nigripennis (Jacoby, 1884)
 Aplosonyx orientalis (Jacoby, 1892)
 Aplosonyx ornatus (Jacoby, 1892)
 Aplosonyx ornatipennis (Jacoby, 1896)
 Aplosonyx pahangi Mohamedsaid, 1990
 Aplosonyx parvulus (Jacoby, 1886)
 Aplosonyx philippinensis (Jacoby, 1891)
 Aplosonyx pictus (Chen, 1939)
 Aplosonyx quadriplagiatus (Baly, 1886)
 Aplosonyx quadripustulatus (Baly, 1877)
 Aplosonyx robinsoni (Jacoby, 1905)
 Aplosonyx rufipennis (Duvivier, 1892)
 Aplosonyx scutellatus (Baly, 1879)
 Aplosonyx semiflavus (Wiedemann, 1819)
 Aplosonyx shelfordi (Jacoby, 1905)
 Aplosonyx smaragdipennis (Chevrolat, 1838)
 Aplosonyx speciosus (Baly, 1879)
 Aplosonyx spenceri Kimoto, 1989
 Aplosonyx sublaevicollis (Jacoby, 1889)
 Aplosonyx sumatrae (Weber, 1801)
 Aplosonyx sumatrensis (Jacoby, 1884)
 Aplosonyx tianpingshanensis Yang, 1995
 Aplosonyx tibialis (Baly, 1865)
 Aplosonyx varipes (Jacoby, 1892)
 Aplosonyx wallacei (Jacoby, 1894)
 Aplosonyx yunlongensis Jiang, 1992

References 

  Chrysomelidae in Synopsis of the described Coleoptera of the world

Chrysomelidae genera
Galerucinae
Taxa named by Louis Alexandre Auguste Chevrolat